The SAS Survival Handbook is a survival guide by British author and professional soldier, John Wiseman, first published by Williams Collins in 1986. Second, revised edition came out in 2009. A digital app for smartphones based on the book is also available. The book spans over 11 sections, and an introduction and postscript, detailing how to survive in dangerous surroundings.

Overview

With this book, John Wiseman seeks to provide the reader with the knowledge to survive any wilderness survival or disaster situation. It details basic survival skills, like how to build a fire, to more complex and situation-specific skills, like how to take shelter while indoors during an earthquake.

Publication

A third, expanded version of the book was published in 2014. A section on "Urban Survival" was added for this edition.

Reception

The book is a popular choice among survivalists and preppers.

Sections
Essentials: The basics of what you need to do to prepare for a journey and how to collect salt and water.
Strategy: How to avoid getting yourself into a disaster situation.
Climate & Terrain: How to survive in all manner of different environments from polar regions to arid regions.
Food: How to track and kill animals and prepare them to eat.
Camp Craft: How to set up campsites and tie knots and make fires correctly and quickly.
Reading the Signs: The details of navigation by stars and by the sun.
On the Move: How to cross dangerous areas relatively safely with minimal loss.
Health: Learning first aid priorities and procedures, such as the Heimlich manoeuvre and others and a small encyclopedia of medicinal and poisonous plants and dangerous or poisonous animals.
Survival at Sea: How to survive afloat in the open water.
Rescue: How to get oneself rescued and signalling for help (includes tutorial for Morse code).
Disasters: How to survive major disasters, such as floods, avalanches, hurricanes, tornadoes, volcanoes, earthquakes and nuclear aftermaths.

See also
Survival skills
Special Air Service

References

External links
Errata and corrigenda
Wiseman's official site
Wiseman's DVD Edition

Survival manuals